Ramesh Tawadkar  is an Indian Politician from the state of Goa.He is the current Speaker of Goa Legislative Assembly and Member of Legislative assembly representing the Canacona constituency. He is a member of the Bharatiya Janata Party.

Ministry
He is a minister in the Laxmikant Parsekar-led government in Goa. While serving as sports and youth minister of Goa, Tawadkar was criticized in 2015 for remarks he made about the LGBT community.

Portfolios
He is in charge of
Agriculture
Animal Husbandry and Veterinary Services.  
Tribal Welfare 
Sports and Youth Affairs.

External links 
  Goa council of ministers

References 

Goa MLAs 2022–2027
Living people
Bharatiya Janata Party politicians from Goa
People from South Goa district
Maharashtrawadi Gomantak Party politicians
Year of birth missing (living people)